The Great North Road is a historic road that was built to link early Sydney, in the Colony of New South Wales, now Australia, with the fertile Hunter Valley to the north.

The road is of such cultural significance it was included on the Australian National Heritage List on 1 August 2007 as a nationally significant example of major public infrastructure developed using convict labour and on the UNESCO World Heritage list as amongst:

" .. the best surviving examples of large-scale convict transportation and the colonial expansion of European powers through the presence and labour of convicts."

The road was an engineering triumph, with some sections constructed to a notably high standard. It was not an unqualified success in practical terms. Apart from the steep grades, there was a lack of water and horse feed along the route. For these reasons it quickly fell into disuse with the development of alternative means of getting to the Hunter Valley, such as steamships and newer roads. Much of the road fell into total disuse while other parts were absorbed into the urban and rural road network.

The route
The Great North Road commences at Parramatta Road, at what is now the Sydney suburb of Five Dock. Historically, it crossed the Parramatta River by boat at Abbotsford, after which passed through Ryde and Dural before reaching the Hawkesbury River at Wisemans Ferry,  to the north. It then winds through isolated and often rugged bushland along the edge of Dharug National Park, continuing through Bucketty until forking at Wollombi. From there one branch continues to Warkworth via Broke and the other goes to Cessnock, Maitland and on to Newcastle.

The Great North Road today
The Great North Road survives to this day, but different parts are preserved in very different ways. Much of it is under bitumen and concrete, either as suburban streets or rural backroads, while some is preserved in national parks and protected from vehicular traffic.

Slight evidence of its past, such as bypassed bridgeworks or even convict rock carvings, survives within the Sydney metropolitan area; by contrast large stretches remain in original condition north of the Hawkesbury River.

The first few kilometres, from Parramatta Road at Five Dock to the Parramatta River at Abbotsford, pass through the largely residential suburb of Wareemba. The historic name is retained for this section, the only reason anyone would think twice about this unremarkable piece of suburban road lined with houses and a few village shops and cafes. This section of the road ends at Abbotsford ferry wharf, there being no longer a corresponding wharf on the north bank.

On the opposite bank of the Parramatta River, the former alignment of the Great North Road leading from the former ferry wharf is now called Punt Road, in Gladesville. Punt Road ends at Victoria Road. The former alignment is picked up again just northwest of Top Ryde City shopping centre, as North Road, in Ryde, leading to Blaxland Road in Eastwood. 

The road then recommences at the Baulkham Hills intersection with Windsor Road. Known as Old Northern Road, and Tourist Drive 15, it winds up past the suburbs of Castle Hill, Glenhaven, Dural, before continuing north as a two-lane undivided road. Old Northern Road terminates at Wiseman's Ferry. At Bucketty, it is once again renamed the Great North Road.

Two sections of the original route: the Devine's Hill (Wisemans Ferry) to Mount Manning section and the Mount Manning to Wollombi section are listed on the New South Wales Heritage Register.

Preservation
In 1990, the local communities of Bucketty and Wollombi established the 'Convict Trail Project', aiming to restore, maintain and promote the road as a museum of convict engineering. Original sections of the road which are on view have provided valuable insight into early road construction techniques in the colony of New South Wales, and how English road-building technology of the time was imported and adapted. Prisoners from facilities managed by Corrective Services NSW have been involved with maintenance.

World Heritage list 
In July 2010, at the 34th session of the UNESCO World Heritage Committee, the Great North Road and ten other Australian sites with a significant association with convict transportation were inscribed as a group on the World Heritage List as the Australian Convict Sites. The listing explains that the 11 sites present "the best surviving examples of large-scale convict transportation and the colonial expansion of European powers through the presence and labour of convicts". Of the 11 sites the Hyde Park Barracks, Cockatoo Island, Old Government House at Parramatta are also within the Sydney region.

As part of the works to bring about public engagement with the UNESCO World Heritage Listed 'Old Great North Road' that is managed by the NSW National Parks & Wildlife Service, a living history theatre production was commissioned to tell some of the stories in-situ on Devine's Hill in Dharug National Park, Wiseman's Ferry, along the living remnants of The Road itself. 'Convict Footprints on the Old Great North Road' is a heart-touching, at times funny, at times deeply sad journey with the men and women that built The Road along the very cobbles they themselves walked.

Engineering heritage award 
The road is listed as a National Engineering Landmark by Engineers Australia as part of its Engineering Heritage Recognition Program.

Gallery

See also

 Old Great North Road (Devine's Hill to Mount Manning Section)
 Great North Road (Mount Manning to Wollombi Section)
 Australian Convict Sites

References

External links 

 

Historical roads of New South Wales
Streets in Sydney
Transport on the Central Coast (New South Wales)
Convictism in New South Wales
Australian Convict Sites
Protected areas of New South Wales
1825 establishments in Australia
Roads in the Hunter Region
The Hills Shire
Hornsby Shire
City of Cessnock
World Heritage Sites in New South Wales
Recipients of Engineers Australia engineering heritage markers